The Rand Building is a historic commercial building in Huntsville, Alabama.  Built in 1883, it and the adjacent building, the Donegan Block, represent a simplified Italianate architecture style common in smaller towns in the late 19th century.  It is one of few remaining Italianate buildings which once were prevalent on Courthouse Square.  The two-story green-painted brick building has an elaborate bracketed metal cornice with decorative panels between the brackets.  The street-level façade has large four-pane fixed windows supported by paneled bulkheads, with a central recessed entry.  A second row of smaller windows runs above the first, below a smoothed concrete header panel which along which an awning runs the width of the building.  On the second floor, three two-over-two sash windows with segmental arched tops are in a frame recessed one course from the rest of the building.  It was listed on the National Register of Historic Places in 1980.

References

National Register of Historic Places in Huntsville, Alabama
Italianate architecture in Alabama
Commercial buildings completed in 1883
Buildings and structures in Huntsville, Alabama